The 1996 United States Senate election in Oregon was held on November 5, 1996. Incumbent Republican United States Senator Mark Hatfield decided to retire after thirty years in the Senate. Oregon State Senate President Gordon H. Smith, who had run for the Senate earlier that year, won the Republican primary, while businessman Tom Bruggere won a contested Democratic primary. The contest between Smith and Bruggere was one of the toughest that year, but ultimately, Smith was able to keep the seat in the Republican column and defeated Bruggere by a narrow margin.

Democratic primary

Candidates
 Tom Bruggere, businessman
 Bill Dwyer, State Senator
 Harry Lonsdale, businessman and nominee for the U.S. Senate in 1990
 Anna Nevenich, nurse and perennial candidate
 Jerry Rust, candidate for Governor of Oregon in 1982

Results

Republican primary

Candidates
 Kirby Brumfield
 Robert J. Fenton, candidate for the U.S. Senate in the 1996 special election
 Jeff Lewis, nominee for the State House of Representatives in 1994
 Lon Mabon, conservative activist
 Gordon H. Smith, President of the Oregon State Senate and nominee for the U.S. Senate in the 1996 special election

Results

General election

Campaign
This was the second Senatorial race for Gordon Smith in 1996; he had previously lost to Ron Wyden in the special election to fill Bob Packwood's seat.

Both candidates spent heavily from their own resources. Bruggere won the Democratic nomination with $800,000 of his own money in the primary race, and was one of 134 candidates for the U.S. Congress to finance their own elections in excess of $50,000 in that cycle. Smith had already spent $2.5 million of his own money earlier that same year in an unsuccessful effort to defeat Democrat Ron Wyden in the 1996 special election to replace Bob Packwood, who had resigned.

Shortly after their respective primary victories, the rivals met for a highly publicized lunch, and agreed to run issue-oriented campaigns. However, in the final weeks of the campaign, Bruggere supporters ran advertisements alleging a pollution problem with Smith's frozen foods business, which the Smith campaign characterized as a breach of that agreement. A Boston Globe profile highlighted their similarities as corporate candidates with minimal political experience.

In the general election race, most Oregon daily newspapers endorsed Smith over Bruggere. The race was close, with neither side claiming victory for several days after the election, as absentee ballots were tallied. After all votes were counted, Smith won by 4 percentage points. It was the last of the 1996 Senate elections to be determined; overall, the Republicans gained two seats in the Senate, increasing their majority from 53 to 55 seats.

Results

See also 
 1996 United States Senate elections

References 

Oregon
1996
Senate